Erwin Blask (March 20, 1910 – February 6, 1999) was a German athlete who competed mainly in the hammer throw event. He won the silver medal for Germany at the 1936 Summer Olympics held in Berlin, Germany. He was born in Friedrichsheyde, East Prussia (today Gajrowskie, Poland) and died in Frankfurt am Main.

References

1910 births
1999 deaths
People from Giżycko County
Sportspeople from Warmian-Masurian Voivodeship
German male hammer throwers
Olympic silver medalists for Germany
People from East Prussia
Athletes (track and field) at the 1936 Summer Olympics
Olympic athletes of Germany
European Athletics Championships medalists
Medalists at the 1936 Summer Olympics
Olympic silver medalists in athletics (track and field)
Officers Crosses of the Order of Merit of the Federal Republic of Germany